Katharine Jane (Kate) Rattray (born 1962) is an alpine skier from New Zealand.

In the 1984 Winter Olympics at Sarajevo, she came 29th in the Downhill.

In the 1988 Winter Olympics at Calgary, she came 21st in the Slalom, and 28th in the Super G.

References  
 Black Gold by Ron Palenski (2008, 2004 New Zealand Sports Hall of Fame, Dunedin) p. 107

External links  
 
 

Living people
1962 births
New Zealand female alpine skiers
Olympic alpine skiers of New Zealand
Alpine skiers at the 1984 Winter Olympics
Alpine skiers at the 1988 Winter Olympics